Special View is the second compilation album by English power pop band The Only Ones. Released in 1979 in the United States it consists of tracks selected by the American label Epic from the band's first two CBS (UK) albums (The Only Ones and Even Serpents Shine).

Critical reception

In his "Consumer Guide" column for The Village Voice, Robert Christgau commented that Special View is "an ideal introduction" to Peter Perrett, adding that Perrett "may be major if he sticks at it."

In a retrospective review for AllMusic, critic Ned Raggett wrote, "Though a compilation of albums for America rather than a proper release, Special View could almost be a greatest hits of sorts, capturing the unexpected and underrated talents of Perrett and his bandmates for a late-'70s audience well enough and still holding up in later years."

Track listing

Personnel
The Only Ones
Peter Perrett – lead and background vocals, guitars
Alan Mair – bass guitars
John Perry – guitars
Mike Kellie – drums

Session musicians
John "Rabbit" Bundrick – keyboards
Adam Maitland – keyboards, saxophone
Koulla Kakoulli – backing vocals

Production
The Only Ones – production
Robert Ash – production
Alan Mair – production
Peter Perrett – production
Andy Lyden – assistant engineering
Kevin Dallimore – assistant engineering

References

External links

The Only Ones albums
Albums produced by Alan Mair
1979 compilation albums
Punk rock compilation albums
Epic Records compilation albums